Modersmålets sång (Song of the Mother Tongue) is a piece of music in the Swedish language that forms a type of unofficial anthem for the Swedish-speaking population of Finland.
The piece was composed by  Swedish newspaper publisher and music critic Johan Fridolf Hagfors (1857–1931) and performed for the first time in 1898. The song was composed for Finland's oldest choir, the Akademiska Sångföreningen, and was written to be sung by a male chorus.

Lyrics
Hur härligt sången klingar
på älskat modersmål!
Han tröst i sorgen bringar,
han skärper sinnets stål!
Vi hört den sången ljuda
i ljuvlig barndomstid,
och en gång skall han bjuda
åt oss i graven frid!
Du sköna sång vårt bästa arv,
från tidevarv till tidevarv,
ljud högt, ljud fritt
från strand till strand
i tusen sjöars land!

Vad ädelt fädren tänkte,
vad skönt de drömt en gång,
det allt de åt oss skänkte
i modersmålets sång.
Hur våra öden randas,
den sången är oss kär,
Vår själ i honom andas,
vår rikedom han är!
Du sköna sång vårt bästa arv,
från tidevarv till tidevarv,
ljud högt, ljud fritt
från strand till strand
i tusen sjöars land!

References

External links

 Audio file from Åbo Academy university
 Modersmålets sång

Swedish language
Swedish-speaking population of Finland
Finnish songs
Regional songs
1898 songs